HaDavar HaGadol HaBa was an Israeli television show, based on the formula of Got Talent series. The show was first aired in 2007  The show was presented by Noa Tishby. Rules of the show were nearly the same as the original British ones. The program was one of the most popular reality shows in Israel. Castings for the show were held in Haifa. The jury consisted of Yael Bar Zohar, Yehoram Gaon and Moti Reif. Winners of the first (and only) season were acrobatic duo Karen Alankovah and Yaniv Suissa.

External links
Israel's Got Talent 

2007 Israeli television series debuts
2007 Israeli television series endings
Israeli reality television series
Israel
Television series by Fremantle (company)
Channel 2 (Israeli TV channel) original programming
Israeli television series based on British television series